Ammonoosuc or Ammonusuc may refer to:

 Ammonoosuc River, in New Hampshire
 USS Ammonusuc (AOG-23), naval ship

Other rivers in New Hampshire 
 Upper Ammonoosuc River, distinct from the Ammonoosuc
 Wild Ammonoosuc River, a tributary of the Ammonoosuc